Volerro is a project management and collaboration tool.

Reception 
A May 4, 2017 review in PC Magazine gave Volerro 3.5 / 5, concluding that "the intuitive interface, included chat and conferencing tools, and PDF- and image-markup capabilities still combine to make Volerro an attractive package."

References

Task management software